Shea Jia-dong (born 9 October 1948) is a Taiwanese politician.

Education
Shea obtained his doctoral degree from Stanford University in the United States in 1978.

Career
After finishing his doctoral degree, Shea went back to Taiwan to work for the Institute of Economics, where he was an associate research fellow from 1978 to 1982 and a research fellow from 1982 to 2000. Between 1996 and 2000, Shea served as deputy governor of the Central Bank of the Republic of China (Taiwan). Shea was named finance minister in April 2000, and stepped down in October.

References

Living people
Taiwanese Ministers of Finance
1948 births
Stanford University alumni
National Taiwan University alumni